Kostadin Tilev (born 16 July 1942) is a Bulgarian weightlifter. He competed in the men's lightweight event at the 1968 Summer Olympics.

References

1942 births
Living people
Bulgarian male weightlifters
Olympic weightlifters of Bulgaria
Weightlifters at the 1968 Summer Olympics
Sportspeople from Plovdiv